Raghu Romeo is a 2004 Indian Hindi-language black comedy film directed by Rajat Kapoor, starring Vijay Raaz, Sadiya Siddiqui, Maria Goretti, Manu Rishi and Saurabh Shukla. The film was released on 15 August 2003 to critical acclaim and success at the box office. Set in modern-day Mumbai, the film focuses on the life of a waiter working in a dance bar. The film won the National Film Award for Best Feature Film in Hindi.

Plot
Raghu Romeo (Vijay Raaz) is a guileless man from a lower-middle-class family. He is a 30-year-old waiter henpecked by his mother and by the boss who seldom pays him. In his naivete, Raghu thinks he must protect the virtue of the bar's female staff from clients, especially Sweety (Sadiya Siddiqui), who is a hitman's girl whose cynical surface masks a soft spot for the clueless hero. But Raghu only has eyes for Neeta, a quintessential TV-soap suffering-heroine character played by (Maria Goretti). Unable to distinguish between fantasy and real life, Raghu kidnaps the terrified actress and takes her to the countryside house of Sweety. It turns out she is on the hit-list for failing to pay off the entertainment industry's mob "protectors".

Cast
 Vijay Raaz as Raghu
 Sadiya Siddiqui as Sweety
 Saurabh Shukla as Mario
 Maria Goretti as Reshma / Neetaji
 Manu Rishi as Zahid
 Veerendra Saxena as Yadav
 Vijay Patkar as Hari
 Surekha Sikri as Mother
 Ikhlaq Khan as Vermaji
 Anjali Nadig as Mother in law
 Neha Sharma as Sister in law
 Dhruv Singh as Brother in law
 Ayesha Raza as News reader

Music

Awards
 2004 National Film Award for Best Feature Film in Hindi (Silver Lotus Award)
 2003 Best feature film - MAMI International film festival

References

External links
Raghu Romeo the unusual film

2003 films
2000s Hindi-language films
2003 comedy films
Films featuring songs by Pritam
Best Hindi Feature Film National Film Award winners
National Film Development Corporation of India films